The Suzuki Grand Vitara and Toyota Urban Cruiser Hyryder are subcompact crossover SUVs (B-segment) developed by Suzuki and produced by Toyota in India since 2022. The Urban Cruiser Hyryder was released in July 2022 in India ahead of the Grand Vitara. It is available with a range of mild and strong hybrid petrol powertrains. The Grand Vitara replaced the S-Cross in India, while the Urban Cruiser Hyryder indirectly replaced the smaller Urban Cruiser, a rebadged . In January 2023, the Toyota-badged model was released as the Toyota Urban Cruiser in South Africa.

Overview 
Prior to the launch of Grand Vitara, the Urban Cruiser Hyryder was released first in India on 1 July 2022. The Grand Vitara followed later on 20 July. The vehicle was developed by Suzuki using the Global C platform shared with the SX4 S-Cross and the Vitara.

The mild hybrid model, marketed as "Smart Hybrid" by Suzuki and  "NeoDrive" by Toyota, uses Suzuki's 1.5-litre K15C four-cylinder engine and the Smart Hybrid system developed by Suzuki. For the strong hybrid model, Suzuki incorporated the Toyota Hybrid System to the vehicle (marketed as "Intelligent Electric Hybrid" by Suzuki), which includes Toyota's 1.5-litre M15D-FXE three-cylinder engine similar to the XP210 series Toyota Yaris/Yaris Cross. Both engines met the Bharat Stage VI (BS VI) emission standards.

Production of both models started in August 2022 at Toyota Kirloskar Motor's second plant in Bidadi, while sales began in India in September. Planned monthly production of both model is targeted at 18,000 to 19,000 units, with the Grand Vitara contributing 13,000 units. Exports to African markets are planned. In 2022, the vehicle contains 90 percent Indian parts.

Markets

India 
In India, grade levels available for the Grand Vitara are Sigma, Delta, Zeta and Alpha for mild hybrid models, and Zeta+ and Alpha+ for strong hybrid models. An all-wheel drive model marketed as AllGrip is available for the Alpha grade with manual transmission. The model is exclusively available at the Nexa dealership chain reserved for high-end Maruti Suzuki models.

In January 2023, the CNG version of the K15C engine was introduced for the Grand Vitara. The CNG model is only available for Delta and Zeta grades with single manual transmission option.

For the Urban Cruiser Hyryder, grade levels available in India are E, S, G and V, with the former only available as a mild hybrid. An all-wheel drive model is offered for the V mild hybrid grade with manual transmission. CNG models went on sale in January 2023 for S and G grades with manual transmission.

Indonesia 
The Grand Vitara was revealed for the Indonesian market at the 30th Indonesia International Motor Show on 16 February 2023, and launched at the 2nd Gaikindo Jakarta Auto Week on 10 March. It is only available as mild hybrid models powered by 1.5-litre K15C engine paired with a 6-speed automatic transmission, and is available in GL and GX grade levels.

Sales

References

External links 

  (Grand Vitara)
  (Urban Cruiser Hyryder)

Grand Vitara
Cars introduced in 2022
Mini sport utility vehicles
Crossover sport utility vehicles
Front-wheel-drive vehicles
All-wheel-drive vehicles
Hybrid sport utility vehicles
Partial zero-emissions vehicles
Vehicles with CVT transmission